Daub or Daube is a surname. It may refer to:

Daub
Daub may refer to:
 Adrian Daub (born 1980), Professor of German 
 Gerti Daub (born 1937), Miss Germany 1957
 Hal Daub (born 1941), American politician and lawyer 
 Karl Daub (1765–1836), German Protestant theologian

Daube
Daube may refer to:
 David Daube (1909–1999), professor of law at Oxford and Berkeley 
 Dennis Daube, German footballer
 Peter Daube, New Zealand (voice) actor

See also
 Dauber (disambiguation)
 Taube (surname)
 Taubes (surname)

Low German surnames
Occupational surnames